Quicksand is an unincorporated community located in Breathitt County, Kentucky, United States. This small community is along the North Fork of the Kentucky River, directly across the river from where Quicksand Creek flows into the river. For over 200 years, Quicksand has been well-known as "where the Back's live," a very prolific family who were the first settlers to arrive there, in 1791. The family's surname is now spelled, both as "Back" and as "Bach." The family's long, historical association with Quicksand has been documented in many books, including "The Kentucky" by Dr. Thomas D. Clark, and "In the Land of Breathitt" by the Kentucky Writer's Project (and the WPA).

The community post office closed in 1996.

History
The first settlers were Joseph Back (1745-1819), his wife Elizabeth Hoffman-Maggard Back (1755-1826), and their four children: Joseph Back Jr. (1773-1802); John Back (1774-1853); Mary Back (1777-1807); and Henry Back (1785-1871). They had migrated there, from Culpeper County, Virginia (now Madison County, Virginia), and they brought their old Family Bible (a Catechism) with them. That Bible documented their family's genealogy, and it is now on display at the Breathitt County Public Library, in Jackson. In fact, Joseph had tried to buy land near there, a few years before, through a Treasury Warrant (Virginia Patent Series #4414.0). The Back's became one of the most prominent and influential families in Breathitt County. 

Their son John Back (1774-1853) married Catherine Robertson, and in 1836, John and his son Joseph bought 2,500 acres of land in Quicksand, for $2,000 in gold. That land extended, from Quicksand, up Quicksand Creek, on both sides of the creek, for eight miles. Two generations later, John's grandson, Miles Back (1853-1940), was said to own over 20,000 acres, in and around Quicksand. His big, two-story house was up on the hill, in Quicksand, overlooking the river. Miles was married three times, and he had at least twenty children. In 1908, Miles sold 15,000 acres to Fred Mowbray and Edward Robinson, who operated a lumber company in Cincinnati. They built a massive sawmill along the river, in Quicksand, just down the hill from Miles Back's house; it was called "The Mowbray-Robinson Lumber Company." From about 1909 until about 1922, their lumber company cut down all of the old hardwood forests around there. They sold the lumber to the Singer Sewing Machine Company, in South Bend, Indiana, which manufactured wooden cabinets for their sewing machines. Singer made about 10,000 sewing machines a day. 

However, clear-cutting all those trees created an environmental disaster, in and around Quicksand. In 1923, Fred Mowbray and Edward Robinson donated all of that devastated land to the University of Kentucky, forcing the college and the taxpayers to pay to replant the trees, and to attempt to fix all the damage. The university established the Robinson Substation, on land donated by Miles Back, to do that. The Substation was also located just down the hill from Miles' house, along the river. It was on the other side of the Quicksand Bridge, from where the sawmill had been. The people at the Substation replanted some of the trees, and they also worked to improve the agricultural output in the community. The Substation is still in operation today, although the name has been changed to The Robinson Center. 

Starting in 1933, the Back (Bach) family began holding annual family reunions on Miles Back's farm, which continued for nearly seventy years. Upwards of 1,000 people attended, every year. According to dozens of newspaper articles, the genealogy of the family was discussed at the reunions, including their well-documented ancestral connection to the musical composer Johann Sebastian Bach. But in 1994, a few members of the family formed a little club called "The Back-Bach Genealogical Society," even though none of them were genealogists. They knowingly published a fraudulent genealogy of the family, which claimed that the family descended from Harman Back. They only did that because they thought it would make them rich. But all it did was divide the family. In 2015, they created a deceptive DNA Project online, in yet another desperate attempt to prove their fraudulent genealogy; they simply wrote in the name of Harman Back as being the ancestor of each DNA participant, even though he was not the ancestor for the participants from this Back (Bach) family from southeastern Kentucky. 

To this day, many descendants of Joseph Back and his wife Elizabeth Hoffman-Maggard Back still live in Quicksand, and in the surrounding areas.

References

Unincorporated communities in Breathitt County, Kentucky
Unincorporated communities in Kentucky